Hauzenberg is a municipality in the district of Passau, in Bavaria, Germany.

In November 1936, Gauleiter Fritz Wächtler dedicated the Hauzenberg district house. In June 1940, the local National Socialists organized a slide show titled Weltpirat England and U-Boot auf Kaperfahrt. Party leader Heilmaier seized the opportunity to announce regulations about how to deal with Polish farm laborers and prisoners of war.

Twin towns — sister cities

Hauzenberg is twinned with:
 Vöcklabruck, Austria
 Slovenj Gradec, Slovenia
 Český Krumlov, Czech Republic

References

Passau (district)